Peter Roland Mikael Lönn (born 13 July 1961) is a Swedish former footballer who played as a defender. He won seven caps for the Sweden national team and represented the Sweden Olympic football team at the 1988 Summer Olympics where he scored two goals.

References

External links
Profile at Sports-reference.com
 youtube.com winning goal against West Germany at YouTube
 rsssf.com at RSSSF
 
 foradejogo.net European Cup appearance data

1961 births
Swedish footballers
Swedish expatriate footballers
Allsvenskan players
IFK Norrköping players
Neuchâtel Xamax FCS players
Living people
Olympic footballers of Sweden
Footballers at the 1988 Summer Olympics
Expatriate footballers in Switzerland
Association football defenders
Sweden international footballers
Sportspeople from Norrköping
Footballers from Östergötland County